Edward Earle (16 July 1882 – 15 December 1972) was a Canadian-American stage, film and television actor. In a career which lasted from the 1910s to 1966, he appeared in almost 400 films between 1914 and 1956. He was born in Toronto and died in Los Angeles, aged 90.

Partial filmography

References

External links

1882 births
1972 deaths
Canadian male film actors
Canadian male silent film actors
20th-century Canadian male actors
Male actors from Toronto
Canadian emigrants to the United States